Sir William Allmond Codrington Goode  was a British colonial administrator who served as Governor of Singapore from 1957 to 1959, and Governor of North Borneo from 1960 to 1963.

Early life
Goode was born in Twickenham, Middlesex, and attended Oakham School and Worcester College, Oxford.

Career
Goode joined the Malayan Civil Service in 1931, studying law in his spare time. He was admitted to the bar by Gray's Inn in 1936. From 1936 to 1939 he served as district officer, Raub, and thereafter as assistant financial secretary of Singapore in 1939. He was appointed assistant commissioner for civil defence, Singapore in 1940, serving in the Singapore Volunteer Corps as a lance corporal during the Second World War. After the colony's capitulation in 1942, he was taken prisoner by the Japanese and sent to work in Siam on the Burma Railway from 1943 to 1945. He remained in Malaya after the war, and in 1948 became deputy economic secretary to the Federation. In 1949 he was posted to Aden as chief secretary, where he also acted as governor from 1950 to 1951. He returned to Singapore as colonial secretary in 1953 and became the colony's last British governor in 1957. In 1959, as part of transitional arrangements, he was made Yang di-Pertuan Negara of the State of Singapore from June to December, and United Kingdom Commissioner. From 1960 to 1963 he was the last governor and Commander-in-Chief of North Borneo.

Awards and honours
He was invested with Companion of the Order of St Michael and St George (CMG) in the 1952 New Year Honours and Knight Commander of the Order of St Michael and St George (KCMG) in 1957.

He was knighted with Order of the Hospital of Saint John of Jerusalem (KStJ) in 1958.

He was made Grand Commander of the Order of St Michael and St George (GCMG) in the 1963 New Year Honours shortly before his retirement to Berkshire, England.

Personal life
In 1938, Goode married Mary Harding. She died in 1947 and three years later he married Ena Mary McLaren.

Goode died in Goring-on-Thames in 1986, aged 79.

References

External links

Administrators in British Singapore
Colony of Aden people
Governors of North Borneo
1907 births
1986 deaths
Burma Railway prisoners
Alumni of Worcester College, Oxford
Knights Grand Cross of the Order of St Michael and St George
Knights of the Order of St John
People educated at Oakham School
Chief Secretaries of Singapore
Governors of the Straits Settlements